According to the National Institute of Statistics of Bolivia (INE), a city is classified as an area where the city limits are identifiable, and its local government is recognized. Bolivia has 1,384 cities. As of 21 November 2012, the date of the most-recent national census, 53 cities have a population of at least 10,000 in Bolivia, as enumerated by the INE. These 53 cities have a population of 6,162,346, accounting for 61.4% of the country's population. The largest city is Santa Cruz de la Sierra, with a population of 1,441,406, a 29.4% increase from the last census date of 5 September 2001. La Guardia had the highest percentage increase, 801.5%, from 2001 to 2012.

From 2001 to 2012, Bolivia had a population increase of 21.1%. Of the 53 cities, 42 had a higher increase than 21.1%, 8 had lower increase and 3 had a small decrease. The three cities that had a negative population growth from 2001 to 2012 are La Paz (–4.1%), Yacuíba (–4.2%), and Santa Ana del Yacuma (–5.4%). With the exception of the Department of La Paz, each department's capital city is the largest city in its respective department. The Department of Santa Cruz has the most cities (18), and Pando and Chuquisaca have the least (1).

List

Notes 
A  In 2001, Yapacaní did not exist. The INE consolidated 19 cities, which had a 2001 population of 16,572, for the 2012 census to form Yapacaní.

References 

Bolivia, List of cities in
 
Bolivia
Cities